Homona spargotis, the avocado leafroller,  is a moth of the family Tortricidae. It is found in the Australasian realm.

The wingspan is about 3 cm for males and 2 cm for females.

The larvae feed on avocado, Coffea, Camellia sinensis, custard-apple and bilimbi. The species is considered a pest.

External links
Australian caterpillars

Moths described in 1910
Homona (moth)